100 Jahre – Der Countdown (English - 100 Years - The Countdown) is a German documentary television series produced by Zolcer TV. It was first broadcast in 1999 on ZDF.
The host of the series is Guido Knopp. Most of the 100 episodes focus on a single event in a given year. The total length of the series is about 16  hours. The series was first broadcast on the last 100 days of 1999, one episode after the daily news cast . Since New Year's Eve 1999 the full length of "100 Jahre" is broadcast several times a year by Phoenix.

Structure
Each of the ten-minute episodes begins with a title. It first shows the Earth from space. As earth comes closer into view, the series title track plays along with historic recordings. These are:

"Three, Two, One" - Apollo 11 countdown

"I Have a Dream" - Martin Luther King Jr.

"Do you want total war?" - Joseph Goebbels

"We choose freedom!" - Konrad Adenauer

"I am a Berliner" - John F. Kennedy

"The wall must go!" - Willy Brandt

"We are the people!" - Monday demonstrations in East Germany

After the opening credits three events of the year are briefly shown followed by an introduction. In this we see the Earth again before the featured year is displayed and the view through the closed hallmark of the second-ranked 9 on the respective continent zooms. After this begins the actual sequence that is about the last-mentioned event. This is used as a hook for a more detailed consideration of the topic, not limited only to the year. Several of the previously mentioned issues are addressed briefly in other episodes.

The individual effects are rotated so that when taken by itself conclusive, and the knowledge from previous episodes is not necessarily required. For example, in the wake of falling to his knees in Warsaw (1970) again reported a lot about the Warsaw ghetto, with The Boy from Warsaw (1943) having its own segment.

No known episode was made for 1902, 1904, 1905, 1908, 1910, 1915, 1921, 1931, 1935, 1950, 1952, 1957, 1971, 1973, 1984 and 1996. The year 1999 is also omitted. The years 1922, 1936, 1937, 1938, 1941, 1943, 1945, 1954, 1967, 1968, 1972, 1974, 1986 and 1991, however, had two episodes, and for 1953, three.

The zooming into the continents is usually to Europe, followed by North America and Asia. South America was rarely shown, only twice (1960 - Operation Eichmann, 1982 - The Falklands War); Antarctica and Australia are not shown at all.

Episodes

The documentary is divided into ten chapters:

Chapter 1: World on the Move
 1900 - Long Live the Century
 1901 - The grandmother of Europe
 1903 - The Dream of Flying
 1906 - The Earthquake in San Francisco
 1907 - The Magician and the Empress
 1909 - Votes for Women!
 1911 - The Race to the South Pole
 1912 - The Sinking of the Titanic
 1913 - The Last German Emperor*

Chapter 2: Trench Warfare
 1914 - The Assassination in Sarajevo
 1916 - The Hell of Verdun
 1917 - The Red Revolution
 1918 - Long Live the Republic!
 1919 - The Dictated Peace*

Chapter 3: Crazy Years
 1920 - The Big Prohibition*
 1922 - Mussolini's March on Rome*
 1922 - The Grave of Tutankhamun
 1923 - Hitler's Coup
 1924 - Stalin's Grip on Power
 1925 - Chaplin in the Gold Rush*
 1926 - The Black Venus
 1927 - The first Atlantic flight
 1928 - The Medicine of the Century
 1929 - The Black Friday
 1930 - Gandhi's Salt March
 1932 - Weimar at its End*

Chapter 4: Hitler in power
 1933 - Hitler's Subreption of Power
 1934 - Mao's Long March*
 1936 - At the Moment of Death*
 1936 - The Beautiful Illusion
 1937 - The Zeppelin Inferno*
 1937 - Stalin, the Dictator
 1938 - The Bought Peace*
 1938 - The Pogrom Night

Chapter 5: Total war
 1939 - The Raid
 1940 - Hitler in Paris*
 1941 - "Operation Barbarossa"
 1941 - Attack on Pearl Harbor
 1942 - Crime Scene Auschwitz*
 1943 - Decision at Stalingrad
 1943 - The Boy from Warsaw (was not originally aired on television)
 1944 - The Longest Day
 1945 - The Red Flag over the Reichstag*
 1945 - The Bomb

Chapter 6: New Beginning
 1946 - The Tribunal of the Victors
 1947 - The Struggle for Israel*
 1948 - Berlin Candy Bomber
 1949 - Birth of the Federal Republic*
 1951 - Churchill's Last Battle*
 1953 - Triumph on Everest
 1953 - The Coronation*
 1953 - Stones Against Tanks
 1954 - Marilyn Myth
 1954 - The Bombing of Bikini
 1955 -  The Return of the Ten Thousand*

Chapter 7: Cold War
 1956 - The Hungarian Uprising
 1958 - The King of Rock 'n' Roll
 1959 - The Victory of Fidel Castro*
 1960 - Operation Eichmann*
 1961 - The Shock of Berlin
 1962 - On the Edge of Nuclear War
 1963 - The Murder of the Century
 1964 - Cassius Clay becomes World Champion*
 1965 - Beatlemania*
 1966 - The Third Goal
 1967 - The Death of Benno Ohnesorg*
 1967 - War in the Holy Land
 1968 - The Fatal Shot*
 1968 - Words Against Tanks*

Chapter 8: Changing World
 1969 - Departure to the Moon
 1970 - Warschauer Kniefall
 1972 - The Girl from Vietnam
 1972 - The Munich Massacre
 1974 - The Chancellor Spy*
 1974 - The Watergate Scandal
 1975 - Escape from Saigon*
 1976 - Uprising of the Children*
 1977 - The Assignment
 1978 - The Test-tube Baby*
 1979 - The Power of the Ayatollah

Chapter 9: Reversing years
 1980 - The Strike of Gdansk*
 1981 - Shots at the Pope
 1982 - The Falklands War*
 1983 - Hitler's Fake Diaries
 1985 - Patient Zero
 1986 - The Challenger Tragedy
 1986 - The Meltdown at Chernobyl
 1987 - The Case Barschel*
 1988 - The drama of Gladbeck* (was not originally aired on television)
 1989 - The Miracle of Berlin
 1990 - The German Unity*

Chapter 10: Changing World
 1991 - Operation Desert Storm
 1991 - Coup in Moscow
 1992 - The Bosnian tragedy
 1993 - Debacle in Somalia*
 1994 - Mandela's victory
 1995 - Murder in the Holy Land*
 1997 - Death of a Princess
 1998 - The President and the Maiden

The series has been released on DVD. The contributions marked with * are not included on the DVD release.

See also
 List of German television series

External links
 

German documentary television series
1999 German television series debuts
1999 German television series endings
German-language television shows
ZDF original programming